Danilo Petrović-Njegoš may refer to:

 Danilo I, Metropolitan of Cetinje (1670–1735), Metropolitan of Cetinje
 Danilo I, Prince of Montenegro (1826–1860), ruling Prince of Montenegro
 Danilo, Crown Prince of Montenegro (1871–1939), Crown Prince of Montenegro

See also
 Danilo Petrović (disambiguation)